Livet är en schlager (Life is a Schlager, also known as Once in a Lifetime or Hånden på hjertet in Danish) is a Swedish film released in 2000, written by Jonas Gardell and directed by his usual directing partner Susanne Bier. The film features cameo appearances by many Swedish singers. The film was produced by Nordisk Film and Sveriges Television in association with Sonet Film and TV2 Denmark.

Plot
The film is based around the life of Mona Berglund, a mother-of-four obsessed with the Eurovision Song Contest - so much so, that her house is decorated with posters of her idols, and she has named her children after Swedish Eurovision performers: Kikki, Anna Book, Lena PH and Carola. Her partner Bosse is unemployed, and she is left to feed the family. Her brother, Candy, is a transvestite and an AIDS-sufferer who designs clothes. David, Mona's employer has cerebral palsy and is a proficient songwriter, and composes a song which Mona steals and sends a demo of (with her own lyrics) into Melodifestivalen, the Swedish heats for the Eurovision contest. Much to Mona's delight, the song qualifies for the finals. Mona's new-found fame takes her to unexpected places, including a TV interview, and an invitation to lunch at Berns. Throughout, the film, though, Mona is torn as to whether she should reveal that she was not in fact the only writer of her song, and thus risk losing the public's support.

Music
The film features several songs by well-known Swedish singers, such as "If Life Was a Song", performed by Carola Häggkvist, "I Believe in Miracles" performed by Lena Philipsson and "Kärleksikonen" performed by Regina Lund.

The film also features the song "Aldrig ska jag sluta älska dig", originally performed by Helena Bergström, which was later released by Gardell, and "Handen på hjärtat" performed by Sofia Källgren. "Handen på hjärtat" was released on the soundtrack but was performed by Björn Kjellman feat. Salome.

Cast and characters
Helena Bergström as Mona
Jonas Karlsson as David
Björn Kjellman as Candy Darling
Thomas Hanzon as Bosse
Sissela Kyle as Woman at the employment office
Katarina Ewerlöf as Moa, project manager
Regina Lund as Sabina
Douglas Johansson as Hairdresser
Jessica Zandén as Woman at the café
Frida Hallgren as TV engineer

References

External links
 Review from Filmtipset.se

2000 films
Swedish LGBT-related films
Cross-dressing in film
Films directed by Susanne Bier
Nordisk Film films
Films about the Eurovision Song Contest
Melodifestivalen
2000s Swedish-language films
2000s Swedish films